Road Hockey Rumble is a half-hour reality series produced by Paperny Entertainment and broadcast on OLN. The series uses a documentary format but crosses over into the genres of sports, travel, and comedy. It follows two Canadian hosts, Calum MacLeod and Mark McGuckin playing their way across Canada in a 13-game grudge match series of Road Hockey. From British Columbia to Newfoundland and all of the territories, they tap into the rivalries, legends and grit of Canada’s most colourful and competitive towns. Friends in life but rivals in hockey, each host drafts their own team of locals to battle it out on the court.

A number of past and present NHL hockey players have made appearances or been showcased in the series including Jordin Tootoo, Jason King, Wade Redden, Eric Staal, David Ling, Duane Sutter, Éric Bélanger, Terry Ryan, Tyler Arnason and Eric Chouinard. The show has also featured Canadian Gold Medal Champion Curler Russ Howard and 4 Time World's Strongest Man Magnús Ver Magnússon.

The complete series was released on DVD on July 1, 2009.

Episodes

Season I
Trail, British Columbia
Rivalry: Trail vs. Fruitvale  Winner: Calum
Game Score: Trail: 5 Fruitvale: 15  Punishment: Hood Ornament with Tomatoes
Prince George, British Columbia
Rivalry: Tree Cutters vs. Tree Planters  Winner: Calum
Game Score: Tree Cutters: 2 Tree Planters: 13  Punishment: Blue Stained
Viking, Alberta
Rivalry: Quintons vs. Laskoskys  Winner: Mark
Game Score: Quintons: 11 Laskoskys: 7  Punishment: Man Steer
Lloydminster, Alberta/Saskatchewan
Rivalry: Saskatchewan vs. Alberta Winner: Mark
Game Score: Saskatchewan: 17 Alberta: 12 Punishment: RHR 100 Yard Dash
Regina, Saskatchewan
Rivalry: Brunettes vs. Blondes Winner: Calum
Game Score: Brunettes: 1 Blondes: 11 Punishment: Shins of Silk
Gimli, Manitoba
Rivalry: Non-Icelanders vs. Icelanders Winner: Mark
Game Score: Non-Icelanders: 8 Icelanders: 7 Punishment: Human Shield
Thunder Bay, Ontario
Rivalry: Port Arthur vs. Fort William Winner: Calum
Game Score: Port Arthur: 4 Fort William: 8 Punishment: Firing Squad

Toronto, Ontario
Rivalry: Toronto vs. Canada Winner: Calum
Game Score: Toronto: 1 Canada: 3 Punishment: Spic 'N Spanned
Hudson, Quebec
Rivalry: Francophones vs. Anglophones Winner: Calum
Game Score: Francophones: 5 Anglophones: 6 Punishment: Maple Roll
Moncton, New Brunswick
Rivalry: Low Tech vs. High Tech Winner: Mark
Game Score: Low Tech: 15 High Tech: 0 Punishment: Moncton Takeout
Summerside, Prince Edward Island
Rivalry: Tax Haters vs. Tax Lovers Winner: Calum*
Game Score: Tax Haters: 5 Tax Lovers: 9 Punishment: PEI Pinch
Windsor, Nova Scotia
Rivalry: Believers vs. Skeptics Winner: Mark*
Game Score: Believers: 5 Skeptics: 1 Punishment: Pumpkin of Death
St. John's, Newfoundland
Rivalry: Townies vs. Baymen Winner: Mark
Game Score: Townies: 7 Baymen: 5 Punishment: Triple Threat

Season II
Corner Brook, Newfoundland
Rivalry: Fire vs. Fuzz Winner: Mark
Game Score: Fire: 8 Fuzz: 7  Punishment: Newfie Scrub Down
Tatamagouche, Nova Scotia
Rivalry: Tall vs. Short Winner: Calum
Game Score: Tall: 6 Short: 7  Punishment: Tatmagouche Fooooore!
Charlottetown, Prince Edward Island
Rivalry: Lactose Intolerant vs. Dairy Lovers Winner: Mark
Game Score: Lactose Intolerant: 4 Dairy Lovers: 3  Punishment: Charlottetown S#*t Crow
St. Stephen, New Brunswick
Rivalry: America vs. Canada Winner: Mark
Game Score: Americans: 5 Canadians: 8  Punishment: 1812 Barrage
Quebec City, Quebec
Rivalry: Anglophones vs. Francophones Winner: Calum
Game Score: Anglophones: 4 Francophones: 6  Punishment: RHR Casualty of War
Niagara-on-the-Lake, Ontario
Rivalry: Wine vs. Beer Winner: Calum
Game Score: Wine: 2 Beer: 6  Punishment: RHR Blaaaah
Winnipeg, Manitoba
Rivalry: U. of M. vs. U. of W. Winner: Calum
Game Score: U. of M. 3 U. of W. 4 Punishment: RHR Suicide Pass
Rankin Inlet, Nunavut
Rivalry: Cooked Food Eaters vs. Raw Food Eaters Winner: Mark
Game Score: Cooked 10 Raw 7 Punishment: Rankin Inlet High Kick
Moose Jaw, Saskatchewan
Rivalry: Team Bootlegger vs. Team Ethical  Winner: Calum
Game Score: Bootlegger 2 Ethical 7 Punishment: Taste of Own Medicine
Red Deer, Alberta
Rivalry: Oilers Fans vs. Flames Fans  Winner: Calum
Game Score: Oilers Fans 7 Flames Fans 12 Punishment: Greasy Hooter
Yellowknife, Northwest Territories
Rivalry: Irish vs. Falcons  Winner: Calum*
Game Score: Irish 8 Falcons 3 Punishment: Man Fish
Dawson City, Yukon
Rivalry: Cheechakos vs. Sourdoughs  Winner: Calum
Game Score: Cheechakos 3 Sourdoughs 13 Punishment: Dawson City White Out
Maple Ridge, British Columbia
Rivalry: Mark Lovers vs. Mark Haters  Winner: Mark
Game Score: Mark Lovers 7 Mark Haters 5 Punishment: The Unspeakable Punishment

Awards

2007 Gemini Awards

Road Hockey Rumble for Best General/Human Interest Series - Nominated

2007 Leo Awards
Dwayne Beaver - Best Direction in a Music, Comedy, or Variety Program or Series - Won
Road Hockey Rumble - Best Music, Comedy, or Variety Program or Series - Nominated
Mark McGuckin and Calum MacLeod - Best Performance or Host(s) in a Music, Comedy, or Variety Program or Series - Nominated
Mark McGuckin and Calum MacLeod - Best Screenwriting in a Music, Comedy, or Variety Program or Series - Nominated

2008 Leo Awards
Road Hockey Rumble - Best Music, Comedy, or Variety Program or Series - Won
Dennis Ryan - Best Picture Editing in a Music, Comedy, or Variety Program or Series - Won
Mark McGuckin and Calum MacLeod - Best Screenwriting in a Music, Comedy, or Variety Program or Series - Won
Dwayne Beaver - Best Direction in a Music, Comedy, or Variety Program or Series - Nominated
Brent Belke - Best Musical Score in a Music, Comedy, or Variety Program or Series - Nominated
Calum MacLeod and Mark McGuckin - Best Performance or Host(s) in a Music, Comedy, or Variety Program or Series - Nominated
Joel Norn - Best Picture Editing in a Music, Comedy, or Variety Program or Series - Nominated

References

External links
Road Hockey Rumble official website
Road Hockey Rumble Myspace
Road Hockey Rumble Trailer
Official Road Hockey Rumble page at Paperny Films website
Road Hockey Rumble Video clips

2007 Canadian television series debuts
2008 Canadian television series endings
2000s Canadian reality television series
Television series by Entertainment One